The Persian jird (Meriones persicus) is a species of rodent in the family Muridae found in Afghanistan, Armenia, Azerbaijan, Iran, Iraq, Pakistan, Turkey, and Turkmenistan.

They are brown with white bellies.

The Persian jird's natural habitats are dry rocky hillsides with little vegetation and semi-desert areas. They find shelter in either small burrows or under overhanging rocks. These jirds can also be found living near humans, such as under walls.

In the wild, Persian jirds eat dry plant material and grains, with small insects as a supplement.

Persian jirds usually have two litters a year, each with around seven pups.

Some people keep this species as a pet. They can live to be six or seven years old. They need large cages that allow climbing and leaping.
The high abundance of Persian jird in many areas, as well as their several proper features, makes them a suitable species for biomonitoring programs (Khazaee et al. 2016).

References
 Barker, Julian. (1998-12) The Persian Jird. The Nibbler (Journal of the National Gerbil Society).
 
 Khazaee, M., Hamidian, A. H., Shabani, A. A., Ashrafi, S., Mirjalili, S. A. A., & Esmaeilzadeh, E. (2016). Accumulation of heavy metals and As in liver, hair, femur, and lung of Persian jird (Meriones persicus) in Darreh Zereshk copper mine, Iran. Environmental Science and Pollution Research, 23(4), 3860–3870.https://link.springer.com/article/10.1007%2Fs11356-015-5455-x

Meriones (rodent)
Mammals of Western Asia
Mammals of Azerbaijan
Mammals of Afghanistan
Mammals of Pakistan
Fauna of Iran
Mammals described in 1875
Taxonomy articles created by Polbot